Bailey is an unincorporated community in Lauderdale County, Mississippi, United States. Its ZIP code is 39320.

History
The population of Bailey in 1900 was 56.  The settlement had a post office around that time.

Notes

Unincorporated communities in Lauderdale County, Mississippi
Unincorporated communities in Mississippi